Francis Peter de Campo , (9 July 1923 − 23 April 1998) was an Australian Catholic bishop.

Ordained to the priesthood on 24 July 1949, de Campo was named bishop of the Roman Catholic Diocese of Port Pirie, Australia in 1979 and died in 1998 while still in office. He was made a Member of the Order of Australia (AM) in the 1986 Australia Day Honours for "service to the community and religion".

References 

1923 births
1998 deaths
People from Melbourne
20th-century Roman Catholic bishops in Australia
Members of the Order of Australia
Roman Catholic bishops of Port Pirie